Thomas Girst (born 4 July 1971, in Trier) is a German author and cultural manager.

Life 

Girst graduated from Liverpool High School (New York State) and Rotenbuehl High School in Saarbruecken, Germany. He studied art history, American Studies and German Literature at Hamburg University and New York University. The subject matter of his PhD thesis was "Art, Literature, and the Japanese American Internment" during World War II. He lived in New York between 1995 and 2003, at first on a DAAD academic scholarship. After working at a gallery starting in 1998, in 2000 he became research manager of the Art Science Research Laboratory under the directorship of Stephen Jay Gould, Harvard University. During that time he also was the cultural correspondent for the German daily “Die Tageszeitung.” Since 2003 he is the Head of Cultural Engagement at the BMW Group, Munich. In 2016 he was honored with the "European Cultural Manager of the Year" award.

Girst was the founding editor and publisher (together with the poet Jan Wagner) of "Die Aussenseite des Elementes" (1992–2003), an international anthology of prose, poetry, illustration and art. As a curator, he organized numerous exhibitions, including “Alive and Kicking: the Collages of Charles Henri Ford" at the Scene Gallery in New York as well as "Marcel Duchamp in Munich 1912" at the Lenbachhaus in Munich.
Girst teaches at the Ludwig Maximilian University, Munich, at the Academy of Fine Arts, Munich, as well as at the Academy of Applied Sciences in Zurich. Between 2005 and 2009 he was a member of the Board for Arts Sponsorship within the Association of Arts and Culture of the German Economy at the Federation of German Industries, and since 2010 he sits on their panel for literature. He is a member of the Board of Spielmotor e.V. as well as for the Association of the Architecture Museum, Munich. Since 2012, Girst is cultural representative for the Nymphenburg Porcelain Manufactory. Since 2015, he is a member of the Council of the University of Music and Performing Arts in Munich and a member of the board of trustees of the Friends of Haus der Kunst, Munich. In 2016 he was appointed member of the advisory board for Sky Arts. In 2017, he joined The Indian Biennale Effects and Ecosystems Advisory Board and in 2018 the advisory panel of the Museum of Art and Photography in Bangalore. In 2019 Girst was appointed ambassador of the Saarland by the state's chief minister.

Teaching 
Girst is honorary professor at the Academy of Fine Arts, Munich and teaches as a lecturer at the Ludwig-Maximilians-University of Munich's Faculty of History and the Arts. Aside from international guest lectures he also is a lecturer at the Zurich University of Applied Sciences (ZHAW), at the IED Instituto Europe di Design in Venice and at IE Business School Madrid.

Publications (selection) 
Besides his work as a cultural correspondent for Die Tageszeitung between 2000 and 2003, Girst has published widely within international newspapers, magazines, catalogues and academic journals, including Amerasia Journal, Tate Modern, The Nordic Journal of Aesthetics, Science Ltd., Staatsgalerie Stuttgart, Museo Jumex, Serpentine Galleries, Cooper Hewitt Smithsonian Museum of Design, Kunsthalle Schirn, ICA, ZKM Karlsruhe, The Andy Warhol Foundation, Museum for Applied Arts Cologne, Staatliches Museum Schwerin, Art in America, Frieze, Sotheby's, The Art Newspaper, Frankfurter Allgemeine Zeitung, Art, NYArts, Financial Times, Frankfurter Rundschau, SZ-Magazin, Welt, Wirtschaftswoche).

Author 
 Aftershock: The Readymade in Postwar and Contemporary American Art, New York: Dickinson, 2003 (with Francis M. Naumann) 
 Martin Eder: Die kalte Kraft, Berlin: Hatje Cantz, 2004,  (German, English)
 The Indefinite Duchamp, Berlin: Hatje Cantz, 2013,  (German, English)
 The Duchamp Dictionary, London and New York: Thames and Hudson, 2014,  (English, Korean, Chinese)
 Art, Literature, and the Japanese American Internment, Frankfurt & New York: Peter Lang, 2015, 
 100 Secrets of the Art World, London: Koenig, 2016 (with Magnus Resch), 
 Alle Zeit der Welt, München: Hanser, 2019  (German, Italian, Korean)

Editor 
 Die Außenseite des Elementes Nr. 1-11, Berlin and New York: non profit Art Movement (NPAM), 1992–2003 
 Editor-in-chief, Tout-Fait: The Marcel Duchamp Studies Online Journal Nr. 1–5, New York: Art Science Research Laboratory, 1999–2003 
 Marcel Duchamp in Munich 1912, Munich: Schirmer/Mosel, 2012  (German, English) (with Helmut Friedl, Matthias Mühling, Felicia Rappe)
 BMW Art Cars, Berlin: Hatje Cantz, 2014  (German, English, French)

References

External links 
 Thames and Hudson
 Designers and Books
 BMW Group

21st-century German writers
21st-century German male writers
Living people
1971 births
New York University alumni